The lists of schools in Scotland are divided into several articles:

Private (independent) schools in Scotland
State schools in City Council Areas
State schools in Council Areas A–D
State schools in Council Areas E–H
State schools in Council Areas I–R
State schools in Council Areas S–W
Gaelic medium schools in Scotland
List of Catholic schools in Scotland